Christopher Chen is an obstetrician and gynaecologist in Singapore who in 1986 was the first to successfully freeze a human egg which subsequently led to egg banks being started around the world. In 1998, he successfully produced Singapore's first IVF sextuplets.

Selected publications

References 

Singaporean obstetricians
Singaporean gynaecologists
Fertility medicine
Year of birth missing (living people)
Living people